Kora corallina is a species of a tropical air-breathing land snail, a pulmonate gastropod mollusc in the family Bulimulidae.

Taxonomy
The scientific name Kora corallina is named in honour of Brazilian poet Cora Coralina. Kora corallina is the type species of the genus Kora. It was originally classified with the family Orthalicidae and it was moved to the family Bulimulidae in 2016.

Distribution 
Kora corallina occurs in Santa Maria da Vitória municipality, in Bahia, Brazil.

Description 
This land snail occurs in Bahia, Brazil.

References

Bulimulidae
Gastropods described in 2012